Goleta Union School District (G.U.S.D. or GUSD) is a school district serving the Goleta Valley, a suburban community of 80,000 people which includes the newly formed City of Goleta and a large unincorporated area. The valley lies between the Santa Ynez Mountains and the Pacific Ocean, adjacent to Santa Barbara, California, in the United States. The area is known for its cultural, academic, and recreational opportunities, as well as its mild climate.

The District serves 3,700 elementary students in nine schools, all Kindergarten through Grade 6. Class size averages 20 in Grades K, 1, 2, and 3; and averages 24 in Grades 4, 5, and 6. The District has a diverse student population and professional staff. Approximately 28% of students are English language learners.

The District has a stimulating and challenging atmosphere with a capable, articulate and professional staff. Many teachers, classified employees, and administrators have enjoyed long careers with GUSD. The staff has developed a reputation for working with a diverse student population to develop individual student potential by providing basic skills and problem solving strategies. Programs in composition, computer literacy, and mathematics have been nationally recognized, and District teachers are frequently asked to provide staff development sessions for other districts. All schools offer programs in technology, science, music, art, and physical education. All schools offer a Gifted and Talented Education (GATE) Program in grades 4, 5 and 6. All schools have a computer center, and all classrooms and offices are wired for high-speed communications.

The District’s financial condition is sound. The District has over 253 certificated employees and some 276 classified employees. GUSD maintains excellent special education and support services. Students in the Goleta Union Elementary School District become a part of the Santa Barbara High School District following graduation. They attend Goleta Valley or La Colina Junior High School, in Grades 7 through 8, and Dos Pueblos or San Marcos High School in Grades 9 through 12.

Schools

 Brandon Elementary School
Website
 El Camino Elementary School
Website
 Ellwood Elementary School
Website
 Foothill Elementary School
Website
 Goleta Family School
Website
 Hollister Elementary School
Website
 Isla Vista Elementary School
Website
 Kellogg Elementary School
Website
 La Patera Elementary School
Website
 Mountain View Elementary School
Website

External links
 Official GUSD Website. Links to all schools in the District as well as information about the District as a whole and its governance.

School districts in Santa Barbara County, California
Goleta, California